Tycoch (also written Ty-coch) is a suburban district of the City and County of Swansea in Wales. It is situated in the Sketty ward of the city, north-west of Sketty Cross. The area is chiefly residential. Housing around Carnglas Square is mostly pre-war, while that the higher ground at Llwyn Mawr dates from the 1970s onwards.

Amenities 
There are several shops and other commercial premises in and around Carnglas Square (the junction of Carnglas Road, Harlech Crescent, and Ty-coch Road) including a sub post office, a newsagent, a computer shop, an Indian takeaway, and a wine bar / bistro, but no pub. There is also a pharmacy, a hairdresser for ladies and gents, a professional tuition centre, a print shop, a computer specialist shop, a tanning salon, a clothes clinic and cleaners.  The corner shop/newsagent closed on 8 December 2014 and re-opened as a Co-Operative small supermarket in March 2015. The building was extended and refurbished.

Sketty Primary School is in Llwyn Mawr Close, Carnglas, while tertiary education is provided at the Tycoch campus of Gower College Swansea (the former Swansea College) at the junction of Ty-coch Road and Vivian Road, not far from Sketty Cross.

The Church in Wales opened All Souls Church in Tycoch in 1957. There are in addition two chapels in the area.

Cefn Coed Hospital is located in the northern part of Tycoch at the boundary with Cockett.

Sports superstars Scott Mackay and Robert Phillips, and famous mariner Andrew Roberts all hail from the area.

External links 
Sketty primary School
Gower College Swansea
All Souls Church, Tycoch
Cefn Coed Hospital
Swan CD Computers, Tycoch
Kip McGrath Education Centres

Districts of Swansea